Ceylonosticta anamia (Ana Mia's shadowdamsel) is a species of damselfly in the family Platystictidae. It is endemic to wet zone forests of Sri Lanka.

Identification
The orange-yellowish prothorax is the best way to identify the species.

References

 List of odonates of Sri Lanka

Damselflies of Sri Lanka
Insects described in 2010